The Lancaster Post Office is located in Lancaster, Wisconsin.

History
Operations began in the building in 1939. The following year, a mural by artist Tom Rost was painted on the interior as part of the Public Works of Art Project.

References

Post office buildings on the National Register of Historic Places in Wisconsin
National Register of Historic Places in Grant County, Wisconsin
Public Works of Art Project
Streamline Moderne architecture in Wisconsin
Brick buildings and structures
Limestone buildings in the United States
Government buildings completed in 1938